The Hong Kong cricket team toured the United Arab Emirates to play Oman in November 2015 in three Twenty20 International (T20I) matches. Oman won the 3-match series 2–1. The matches were in preparation for the 2016 Asia Cup Qualifier.

Squads

T20I series

1st T20I

2nd T20I

3rd T20I

References

External links
 Series home at ESPNcricinfo

2015 in Hong Kong cricket
2015 in Omani cricket
International cricket competitions in 2015–16
Hong Kong cricket tours of the United Arab Emirates
Omani cricket tours of the United Arab Emirates
2015 in Emirati cricket